Vermezzo con Zelo is a comune (municipality) in the Metropolitan City of Milan in the Italian region Lombardy.

It was established on 8 February 2019 by the merger of the municipalities of Vermezzo and Zelo Surrigone.

References

Cities and towns in Lombardy